Mott House may refer to:

Mott House (Columbus, Georgia)
Granville-Mott House, Highland Park, IL
Lloyd Hamilton Mott House, Red Bush, KY, listed on the National Register of Historic Places (NRHP)
Peter Mott House, Lawnside, NJ, listed on the NRHP
Morrison-Mott House, Statesville, NC
Mott House, Topeka, KS